Simone Icardi (born 13 September 1996) is an Italian football player. He plays for  club Feralpisalò on loan from Cittadella.

Club career
He made his Serie C debut for Lupa Castelli Romani on 6 September 2015 in a game against Ischia.

On 17 January 2020, he joined Siena on loan.

On 19 September 2020, he signed a 2-year contract with Casertana.

On 10 August 2021, he joined to Serie B side Cittadella. On 1 September 2022, Icardi was loaned to Feralpisalò.

References

External links
 

1996 births
Footballers from Rome
Living people
Italian footballers
S.S. Racing Club Roma players
U.S. Catanzaro 1929 players
Virtus Entella players
A.C.N. Siena 1904 players
Casertana F.C. players
A.S. Cittadella players
FeralpiSalò players
Serie B players
Serie C players
Serie D players
Association football midfielders